EuroInternational is a racing organization (which includes Italian division EuroInternational Srl and American division EuroInternational Inc.) owned by Antonio Ferrari, grandnephew of Enzo Ferrari, formerly known as Euromotorsport.

History
Originally known as Euromotorsport, the team made its CART debut in 1989 with Jean-Pierre Frey at Phoenix. After Frey was unable to complete the USAC Rookie Orientation Program at Indianapolis, the team signed Davy Jones, who qualified for the Indianapolis 500 and finished in 7th place in his only appearance for the team that year.

The team went on to compete in the CART Indy Car World Series, often fielding a number of European pay drivers, from 1989 to 1994.  The team's best finish was 4th place in the 1993 Detroit Grand Prix by Andrea Montermini. The team attempted to qualify its drivers for the Indianapolis 500 a number of times, but only succeeded three times, with Davy Jones in 1989 and 1993 and Mike Groff in 1992. 

The team planned to enter Juri Nurminen in the 1995 CART season, but they did not appear at any of the races. By this time, the team was also racing in the IMSA series and at the 24 Hours of Le Mans, racing a Ferrari 333SP. During 1996, the team raced an Osella sports car in IMSA and entered the 1996 Indianapolis 500 as Osella USA, naming Russ Wicks as driver. However, they did not appear at the event due to a lack of sponsorship.

The team changed its name to EuroInternational in 1997 and moved to the IRL IndyCar Series and fielded a car in two races for Billy Roe, including the 1997 Indianapolis 500.

EuroInternational was away from racing for a few years before resurfacing in Formula Renault and Formula BMW USA.  The team was rumored to return to Champ Car in 2006 but the team never came to fruition. In 2007, the team announced that it had purchased the assets of Alan Sciuto Racing and was preparing to compete in the 2008 Champ Car Atlantic Series with Italian driver Edoardo Piscopo. As the season began, the team fielded a pair of cars for Daniel Morad and Luis Schiavo rather than one for Piscopo.

In 2008 the team also began fielding the Superleague Formula teams for SC Corinthians and Atlético Madrid driven by Antônio Pizzonia and Andy Soucek.

They did not continue in either the Atlantic Championship or Superleague Formula in 2009.

List of drivers
The following drivers made at least one race start in CART for Euromotorsport:

 Jeff Andretti (1994)
 Scott Atchison (1989)
 Tony Bettenhausen Jr. (1990)
 Steve Chassey (1992)
 Andrea Chiesa (1993)
 Guido Daccò (1989–1990, 1992)
 Christian Danner (1992–1993)
 Franck Fréon (1994)
 Jean-Pierre Frey (1989)
 Mike Groff (1990–1992)
 Roberto Guerrero (1991)
 Davy Jones (1989, 1993)
 David Kudrave (1993)
 Jovy Marcelo (1992)
 Andrea Montermini (1993)
 Nicola Marozzo (1991–1992)
 Tero Palmroth (1989, 1992)
 Vinicio Salmi (1992)
 Franco Scapini (1991)
 George Snider (1992)
 Jeff Wood (1991–1994)
 Alessandro Zampedri (1994)

Results

Complete CART Indy Car World Series results
(key)

Complete Indy Racing League results
(key)

Complete Atlantic Championship results
(key)

Superleague Formula

References

External links

Italian auto racing teams
Champ Car teams
IndyCar Series teams
World Series Formula V8 3.5 teams
Superleague Formula teams
Formula BMW teams
German Formula 3 teams
FIA Formula 3 European Championship teams
Italian Formula 3 teams
European Le Mans Series teams
Atlantic Championship teams
American auto racing teams
Formula Renault Eurocup teams
Auto racing teams established in 1989
24 Hours of Le Mans teams